The World Dog Surfing Championships, officially the Norcal Dog Surfing event & World Championships, is an annual dog surfing contest in Northern California, founded in 2016 and organized by TasteTV.

Competition
The surfing contest is divided into up to four dog weight classes, plus a tandem dog and a tandem dog and human contest. There are also a fetch contest and a fashion show. Dogs surf with the assistance of a human who selects the wave or waves for the dog to ride. In the non-tandem portion of the contest, first, second, and third place are awarded in each weight class based on ride length, technique, and attitude as well as wave size during a ten-minute heat, and the top two dogs in each class then compete for the Top All-Around Surfing Championship Awards. The event raises money for animal, surfing, and environmental charities.

History

2016
The first World Dog Surfing Championships, the first dog surfing event in Northern California, took place on September 10, 2016, at Linda Mar Beach in Pacifica, California. Only five dogs competed, in two weight classes; Abbie Girl, an Australian Kelpie originally rescued through Humane Society Silicon Valley, won the overall competition over her friend Brandy, a Pug.

2017
The second annual championship event was held on August 5, 2017, again at Linda Mar Beach in Pacifica. There were three dozen entrants; Abbie again won the overall prize, with Sampson, a Spaniel, second. Humpback whales breached offshore during the surfing. Video of Simon McCoy's unenthusiastic presentation of the story for BBC News was widely shared.

2018
At the 2018 event, held on August 4, again at Linda Mar beach in Pacifica, there were 45 contestants. Gidget, a Pug, won Top Dog and Abbie Girl, whose owner competed with one foot in a cast, received the newly added Spirit of Surfing Award; Shredder of the Year and All Heart awards were also introduced for the first time.

2019
The 2019 event took place on August 3, again at Linda Mar Beach in Pacifica, with approximately 50 contestants. Cherie, a French Bulldog from Newport Beach, won the Medium Surf Dogs and Top Dogs awards.

2020
The 2020 championships, scheduled for August 1, were postponed until 2021 because of the COVID-19 pandemic. A livestream hybrid event took place on September 26, using Zoom for live heats.

2021
The in-person championships scheduled for August 28, 2021 in Pacifica were again postponed because of the COVID-19 pandemic; livestreamed championships were scheduled for October 2.

2022
The 2022 event was held at Linda Mar beach in Pacifica on August 6. The Top Dog award was won by Skyler, a Cattle Dog from Santa Cruz.

Notes

References

External links
 
 

Annual sporting events in the United States
Surfing competitions
2016 establishments in California
Dog sports